Amritsar is a city situated in the state of northern Punjab, the northwestern region of India. It is 25 kilometres (15 miles) away from the Pakistan border. This important Punjab city is the main centre of commerce, culture, and transportation. It is the centre of Sikhism and the principal place of worship for Sikhs. Amritsar is attractive destination for tourists, especially those part of Golden Triangle. Major destinations are:
 Durgiana Temple
 Golden Temple and Heritage Street 
 Punjab State War Heroes' Memorial & Museum
 Bhagwan Valmiki Tirath Sthal
 Sadda Pind
 Urban Haat Food Street
 Gobindgarh Fort
 Ram Bagh Palace and Maharaja Ranjit Singh Museum
 Wagah border
 Partition Museum
 Jallianwala Bagh
 Jang-e-Azadi Memorial near Kartarpur, India

Museum and Memorials
Punjab State War Heroes' Memorial & Museum
 The Partition Museum, Town Hall, Amritsar

 Jang-e-Azadi Memorial, Amritsar-Kartarpur Road

Religious places

Golden Temple

It is the preeminent spiritual site of Sikhism, the Golden temple or Harmandir Sahib is the one of the most sacred pilgrimage sites in North India. The Gurdwara (Sikh temple) is a two storied construction built on 67 ft square platform covered with marble stone. Every day more than 20,000 people, (during special occasions 100,000 people) have free food in the ‘Guru-ka-langer’, irrespective of caste, creed, colour or gender.

Jama Masjid Khairuddin

This architectural beauty situated in the Hall Bazar, was built by Mohd. Khairuddin in 1876. Tootie-e-Hind, Shah Attaullah Bukhari gave a call against the British rule at this holy place.

Bhagwan Valmiki Tirath Asthan

Located on Amritsar-Lopoke road, 11 km to the west of Amritsar city, Bhagwan Valmiki Tirath Sthal dates back to the Ramayana period to Rishi Valmiki’s heritage. There is a hut that marks the place where Sita gave birth to Luv and Kush. Since time immemorial, in November, on the full moon night, a four-day fair is held here.

Other religious places in Amritsar

•    St. Paul’s church

•    Samadhi of Guru Angad Dev Ji

•    Samadhi of Shravan

•    Durgiana Temple (Lakshmi Narayan Temple)

Historical places

Jallianwala Bagh

It is a historic garden and ‘memorial of National Importance’ close to the Golden Temple complex in Amritsar- Punjab, India, preserved in the memory of those wounded and killed in the Jallianwala Bagh Massacre that occurred on the site on the festival of Baisakhi, 13 April 1919. This memorial honours 2000 Indians who were massacred due to indiscriminate firing ordered by British General Michael O’Dyer. these people were participating in peaceful public meeting. There is a memorial well where people jumped to escape the firing, and there is a section wall where bullet marks are visible, and still preserved.

Kalianwala Khoo

In 1857, when Mangal Pandey rebelled against the British, the inspired 400 soldiers platoon stationed at Lahore escaped from their barracks, swam the river Ravi and reached Ajnala. When Mr. Fredric Cooper, the then Deputy Commissioner of Amritsar received the information, he ordered to put them all in a coop-like room. Here, 200 soldiers died of asphyxia and next morning the rest of them were brutally shot dead. Their dead bodies were thrown in Kalianwala Khoo in Tehsil Ajnala.

Jandiala Guru 
A town in Amritsar district known for traditional brass and copper utensil making. It is home to India's only handicraft on UNESCO's List of Intangible Cultural Heritage. The Deputy Commissioner is working to revive interest in this area through Project Virasat.

Pul Moran (also known as Pul Kanjri) 
Pul Kanjri is the historical place associated with the life of Maharaja Ranjit Singh. It was located around 35 Km from Amritsar city. It is 5 km away from Wagah Border. This place was prominent during the Maharaja Ranjit Singh from 1800-1840.

Pul Kanjri has a fantastic architecture with 12 doors to let the airflow all around. The golden time of this monuments ends with the partition of the Punjab, 1947. When Kaballi's attacked the place, the people were killed and historical building was damaged. The place was restored again. Even today, people visit Pul Kanjri to pay their respects.
times of

Other historical sites

•    The Historical Banyan Tree (Shaheedi Bohr)

•    Gobindgarh Fort

Wild Life Sanctuaries

Harike Bird Sanctuary

Created in 1953, this sanctuary located 55 km south of the Amritsar city is also known as ‘Hari-ke-pattan’. The Harike lake situated in the deeper parts of the sanctuary is the largest wetland in northern India. A barrage was constructed at the confluences of Sutlej and Beas rivers to create a shallow reservoir.  It is home to an enormous concentration of migratory waterfowls during winters, 7 species of turtles, 26 species of fishes, and different species of mammals.

Shopping

Hall Bazaar market, located on the way to Golden temple is one of the oldest markets in Amritsar. 

Katra Jaimal Singh market is another famous market for the textile and clothing items other than Shastri market where textile manufacturing industries are located. The traditional Indian jewellery ‘jadau’ can be found in Guru Bazar. For restaurants and showrooms Lahori gate market is quite popular.

Amritsari Naan (a type of bread), Patiala Shalwar (trousers which are atypically wide at the waist but which narrow to a cuffed bottom, worn by women of Punjab), Juttis (Traditional Shoes), handicrafts like Phulkari, and weaponry shops with traditional daggers (kirpan) are available here.

References

A
A